Donkey Kong is a video game series by Nintendo.

Donkey Kong may also refer to:

 Donkey Kong (video game), an arcade game released in 1981
 Donkey Kong (Game & Watch), a handheld electronic game as part of the Game & Watch Multi Screen series
 Donkey Kong (Game Boy), a video game released in 1994
 Donkey Kong (character), the main character in the series
 Donkey Kong (truck), a monster truck

de:Donkey Kong